Daniel Davies may refer to:

 Daniel Davies (Australian politician) (1872–1951), member of the South Australian House of Assembly
 Daniel Davies (bishop) (1863–1928), Anglican bishop of Bangor, 1925–1928
 Daniel Davies (Canadian politician) (1825–1911), Canadian merchant and political figure
 Daniel Davies (musician), British-American musician and composer
 Daniel Davies (rugby league), Welsh rugby league footballer
 Daniel Davies (preacher) (1797–1876), Welsh Baptist preacher
 Daniel John Davies (1885–1970), Welsh Baptist minister and poet
 Daniel Thomas Davies (1899–1966), Welsh physician
 Daniel Oliver Davies (died 1977), British general practitioner
 Dan Davies (born 1965), American actor
 Dan Davies (politician), Canadian politician
 Dan Davies, a fictional character in the British sitcom Man Down (TV series)

See also
 Daniel Davis (disambiguation)